Joseph Oboh Kalu (born 9 January 1940) is a Nigerian boxer. He competed in the men's bantamweight event at the 1960 Summer Olympics.

References

1940 births
Living people
Nigerian male boxers
Olympic boxers of Nigeria
Boxers at the 1960 Summer Olympics
Bantamweight boxers